Älskade Lotten is a Swedish comedy television series. It was first broadcast in 1996. Twenty six 30 minute episodes were produced by MTV.

External links
 

Swedish comedy television series